This list of United States disasters by death toll includes disasters that occurred either in the United States, at diplomatic missions of the United States, or incidents outside of the United States in which a number of U.S. citizens were killed.
 Domestic deaths due to war in America are included except the American Civil War. For stats on this and U.S. military deaths in foreign locations, see United States military casualties of war.
 Due to inflation, the monetary damage estimates are not comparable. Unless otherwise noted, the year given is the year in which the currency's valuation was calculated.

Over 1,000,000 deaths

Over 100,000 deaths

Epidemics with lower death tolls are not included below. See List of epidemics for global statistics.

Over 400 deaths

201 to 400 deaths

81 to 200 deaths

41 to 80 deaths

15 to 40 deaths

See also
 List of missing ships
 List of Indian massacres in North America
 List of disasters in New York City by death toll
 List of disasters in Massachusetts by death toll
 List of battles with most United States military fatalities
 List of the deadliest firefighter disasters in the United States
 List of disasters in Canada by death toll
 List of disasters in Great Britain and Ireland by death toll
 List of disasters in Australia by death toll
 List of disasters in New Zealand by death toll

References

United States
Death toll
Death Toll